Robert Laffineur is emeritus professor of archaeology at the University of Liège and an authority on Mycenaean Greece. He is the founder and co-organizer of the Rencontres égéennes internationales (International Aegean Conferences) in 1986, and editor of Aegaeum. Annales liégeoises d’archéologie égéenne which has been published in forty-two volumes since 1987. In 2014, he was appointed as Honorary Consul of the Hellenic Republic in Liège.

In 2016, he received a festschrift of studies of the Mycenaean world on his 70th birthday edited by Jan Driessen.

References

External links 
http://www.worldcat.org/search?q=au=%22Laffineur,%20Robert%22

Living people
Year of birth missing (living people)
Belgian archaeologists
Academic staff of the Université catholique de Louvain
University of Liège alumni
Honorary consuls